Arewa Dandi is a Local Government Area in Kebbi State, Nigeria, sharing a boundary with the Republic of Niger. Its headquarters are in the town of Arewa Dandi.

It has an area of 3,901 km and a population of 184,030 at the 2006 census.

The postal code of the area is 861.

References

Local Government Areas in Kebbi State